The Christian Party was an American fascist political party founded by William Dudley Pelley in 1935. He chose the 16 August 1935 as the founding date, because it was a so-called "pyramid date". The party can be considered the political wing of Pelley's paramilitary organization, the Silver Legion of America. It ran with Pelley as its candidate for the 1936 presidential campaign (Silver Legion member Willard Kemp was the vice presidential candidate). Pelley gained just 1,600 votes in the election. The party quickly vanished after the United States entered World War II. 

There is also a current Christian Party that was founded in 2009 by a group of self-described "Christian Constitutionalist patriots" in Mobile, Alabama.

References

American nationalist parties
Defunct far-right political parties in the United States